Billmeyer is a surname. Notable people with the surname include:

Alexander Billmeyer (1841–1924), American politician
Mick Billmeyer (born 1964), American baseball player and coach
Kalan Billmeyer (born 2008), American teen girl